Comitas curviplicata is a species of sea snail, a marine gastropod mollusc in the family Pseudomelatomidae.

Description

Distribution
This marine species is found in the Gulf of Aden.

References

 Sysoev, A. V. "Deep-sea conolidean gastropods collected by the John Murray Expedition, 1933-34." BULLETIN-NATURAL HISTORY MUSEUM ZOOLOGY SERIES 62 (1996): 1-30.

External links
 
 Biolib.cz: Comitas curviplicata

curviplicata
Gastropods described in 1996